Omiodes stigmosalis is a moth in the family Crambidae. It was described by Warren in 1892. It is found in Brazil, Panama, Costa Rica, Mexico, Florida and Cuba.

The wingspan is 24–26 mm. Adults have been recorded on wing from March to August and from October to December in Florida.

References

Moths described in 1892
stigmosalis